The 2009–10 Oregon Ducks women's basketball team will represent the University of Oregon in the 2009–10 NCAA Division I women's basketball season. The Ducks will be coached by Paul Westhead. The Ducks are a member of the Pacific-10 Conference and will attempt to win the NCAA championship.

Offseason
April 14: Two additions were made to the Oregon Ducks coaching staff. Keila Whittington and Kai Felton will assist head coach Paul Westhead. Whittington was previously at Marist College, while Felton was at the University of Southern California.
April 20: Former Ducks assistant coach Dan Muscatell will return to the Ducks. For the past six seasons, he was head coach at Sacramento State.  In his six seasons with Sacramento State, his Big Sky Conference record was 36 wins and 21 losses.
May 8: Kristi Fallin, the reigning Northwest Athletic Association of Community College Southern Region Player of the Year, signed a letter of intent to play with the Oregon Ducks. Fallin led the NWAACC with an average of 23 points per game.
May 14: Janell Bergstrom was hired as the team’s Director of Basketball Operations. Bergstrom was a four-time letter winner on the Oregon softball team from 2000 to 2003 and previously worked as the Ducks special assistant to the Executive Senior Athletic Administration.
May 15: It was announced that sophomore forward Eilie Manou and freshman guard Darriel Gaynor have each left the Oregon women’s program. Manou played two seasons for the Ducks and averaged 7.6 points and 5.1 rebounds per game. She played in 57 games and started 34 of them. Gaynor appeared in 26 games and averaged 1.3 points and 1.0 rebounds per game.

Preseason

Regular season

Roster

Schedule

Player stats

Postseason

Pac-10 Basketball tournament
 See 2010 Pacific-10 Conference women's basketball tournament

NCAA Basketball tournament

Awards and honors

Team players drafted into the WNBA

References

External links
 Official Site

Oregon Ducks women's basketball seasons
Oregon
Oregon Ducks
Oregon Ducks